The Lubavitch Yeshiva Gedolah of Johannesburg ("Yeshivas Ohr Menachem") is a Chabad Yeshiva based in Glenhazel, Johannesburg.  It was established by the Lubavitcher Rebbe in 1983, and is headed by Rabbi Noam Wagner, with Rabbi Y. Kesselman as Mashpia .
It focuses on the first two years post high school.

See also
Jewish education in South Africa under History of the Jews in South Africa
Orthodox yeshivas in South Africa
Rabbinical College of Pretoria
Torah Academy School, Johannesburg
Tomchei Temimim
Yeshiva gedolah (Chabad-Lubavitch)

External links and references
 Yeshivah Website, yeshivajoburg.org
Lubavitch Yeshiva Gedolah listing under chabad.org
Interview with Rabbi Wagner

Jews and Judaism in Johannesburg
Orthodox yeshivas in South Africa
Education in Johannesburg
Chabad yeshivas